Gareth Michael James is the John H. Harland Dean of Emory University's Goizueta Business School.

Early life and education 
Gareth M. James is a native of New Zealand. In 1994, he earned a bachelor of science and a bachelor of commerce from the University of Auckland, New Zealand, where he majored in statistics and finance. He was awarded a Fulbright Scholarship to study in the United States and attended Stanford University, where he earned a Ph.D. in statistics in 1998.

Career 
Gareth James is renowned for his visionary leadership, statistical mastery, and commitment to the future of business education. 

James joined the faculty of the Information and Operations Management department at the USC Marshall School of Business in 1998. In 2013, he became professor of data sciences and operations and was named E. Morgan Stanley Chair in Business Administration in 2014. He served as vice dean for faculty and academic affairs from 2013 to 2017 before being named interim dean in 2019.  

In July 2022, James became the John H. Harland Dean of Emory University's Goizueta Business School. 

James is a noted scholar and researcher. His extensive published works include numerous articles, conference proceedings, and book chapters focused on statistical and machine learning methodologies. His work has been cited more than 20,000 times. James is also co-author of the extremely successful textbook, An Introduction to Statistical Learning. He has led multiple National Science Foundation research grants and has served as an associate editor for five top research journals. The recipient of two Dean’s Research Awards from the Marshall School of Business, he is a life member, and elected Fellow, of the American Statistical Association and the Institute of Mathematical Statistics.

His many accolades also encompass honors for his superb teaching and mentoring. James is a recipient of the Evan C. Thompson Faculty Teaching and Learning Innovation Award and three-time winner of the Marshall School of Business’ Golden Apple Award for best instructor in the full-time MBA program. He has also been awarded Marshall and USC’s highest honors for mentoring junior colleagues and graduate students, including the Dean’s Ph.D. Advising, USC Mellon, Evan C. Thompson and Provost’s Mentoring awards.

Family 
James is married and has two children. His wife is a member of the public health faculty at UCLA.

References 

Year of birth missing (living people)
Living people
Data scientists
University of Southern California faculty
New Zealand expatriates in the United States
New Zealand statisticians
New Zealand business theorists
Expatriate academics in the United States
Fellows of the American Statistical Association
Fellows of the Institute of Mathematical Statistics